Ma Laichi (1681? – 1766?), also known as Abu 'l-Futūh Ma Laichi, was a Chinese Sufi master, who brought the Khufiyya movement to China and created the Huasi menhuan (Sufi order) - the earliest and most important Naqshbandi (نقشبندية，納克什班迪) order in Chinese Muslim history.

Life

Afaq Khoja's blessing
Ma Laichi came from a Chinese Muslim family with a military background. His grandfather, Ma Congshan, was a general under the Ming dynasty; his father, Ma Jiujun, passed imperial examinations on the military track under the Qing, but instead of joining government service, made a fortune in business. His home was in Hezhou (now called Linxia), one of the main Muslim centers of Gansu.

According to the legend told by Ma Laichi's followers, Ma Jiajun was still childless at the age of forty, and, desirous to have a son, he went  to Xining, to ask for a blessing from Afaq Khoja, a Naqshbandi shaykh visiting from Kashgar, and a reputed miracle worker. After reciting some prayers, the Kashgarian Sufi master told Ma Jiajun to go back to Hezhou and to marry a certain non-Muslim woman, who had previously been engaged a number of times, but every time her fiancé died before the wedding.  Ma Jiajun indeed married that 26-year-old woman, and she bore him a son. Soon after, all Ma Jiajun's property was destroyed by a fire, and he named his son "Laichi", meaning "[one who] came too late".

Rendered destitute by the fire, Ma Jiajun became a tea peddler, travelling in the region between Hezhou and Xining. His boy, meanwhile, studied at the Koranic school run by Khoja Afaq's disciple  Ma Tai Baba ("The Great Father Ma", 1632–1709) in the nearby Milagou. (apparently, within today's Minhe Hui and Tu Autonomous County).

Tai Baba's top student, Ma Laichi had learned everything the school had to offer by the age of 18. Tai Baba ordained the young Ma as an ahong and initiated him into Sufism, passing onto him the barakah that he had received from Afaq Khoja.

The great Hajj
According to Ma Tong's chronology of Ma Laichi's life, after 30 years of religious work in the Hezhou region, Ma Laichi left China in 1728 for a Hajj to Islam's holy places in the Middle East. In 1728-1733 he studied under a number of Sufi masters in the Arab World (primarily in Mecca and Yemen; some versions of his biography also mention Cairo and Damascus). Due to the scarcity and imprecision of existing Chinese and Arabic sources, different researchers have come up with different versions and dates for Ma Laichi's great Hajj: the standard Chinese account by Ma Tong tells of Ma sailing to Arabia from Guangzhou (after studying for 3 months with a famous ahong there), and coming back by the sea route as well; other accounts have him traveling to the west by land, via Central Asia, and studying for a while in   Bukhara. In Mecca, his teacher was the head of the Khafiya zawiya (Islamic school) there, Muhammad Jibuni Ahmad Agelai (or Ajilai, in other accounts).
Another teacher who influenced him greatly was Mawlana Makhdum, who gave Ma Laichi the name Abu 'l-Futūh. Not much is known about Makhdum, but Joseph Fletcher surmised that he may have been an Indian.

The Khufiyya
After returning to China, Ma Laichi established the  Hua Si ("Multicolored Mosque") school (menhuan) - the core of the Khufiyya  (خفيه) 虎夫耶 movement in Chinese Islam. The name of the movement - a Chinese form of the Arabic "Khafiyya", i.e. "the silent ones" - refers to its adherents' emphasis on silent dhikr (invocation of God's name). The Khufiyya teachings were characterized by stronger participation in the society, as well as veneration of saints and seeking inspiration at their tombs.

Ma Laichi spent 32 years spreading his teaching among the Muslim Hui and Salar people in Gansu and Qinghai. He also converted to Islam numerous Tibetan, Mongol, and Monguor-speaking communities in Qinghai, sometimes after winning a religious debate with a local "Living Buddha". Some of these communities still belong to the Khufiyya, and their members still revere Ma Laichi as the saint who brought their ancestors into Islam.

Death

After the death of Ma Laichi, his position as the  leader of the Khufiyya was inherited by his son, Ma Guobao - an act that came to be strongly criticized by the founder of the competing Jahriyya menhuan, Ma Mingxin. Ma Guobao was later succeeded by Ma Wuyi.

Ma Laichi's grave in Linxia City was restored in 1986. The shrine complex, which includes a mosque and is known as Hua Si Gongbei, continues to be the center of the Hua Si Khufiyya menhuan.

Literature
 (First edition appeared in 1991).

References

17th-century Chinese people
18th-century Chinese people
Hui people
Naqshbandi order
Chinese Sufis
Chinese imams
1680s births
1760s deaths
Year of birth uncertain
Year of death uncertain
Religious leaders in China